The following is a list of main, recurring, supporting, notable and minor characters appeared in The Blood Sisters (TV series), a Filipino drama television series created and developed by Reggie Amigo and Rondel P. Lindayag and produced by ABS-CBN. The series premiered on February 12, 2018 on the network's prime time block, 5:40 or 6:00 p.m. time slot, and on worldwide via The Filipino Channel. The series is under the helm of Jojo A. Saguin and Catherine Grace Abarrando and Roselle Soldao-Ganaban serves as the executive producer for the entire run of the show.

Erich Gonzales stars as the triplets, main character lead portraying three characters with distinct personalities: shy-type young mother from the province, a promising surgeon from an elite family and an aggressive, foul-mouthed social climber. Erich plays Erika, a simple meek girl but feisty and aggressive when provoked. She also plays Carrie, a socialite, cool person with a calm personality. And finally, Agatha, cold-hearted and a gold digger who wants to become rich and powerful. Enchong Dee, AJ Muhlach and Ejay Falcon stars as the leading man. While, Maika Rivera star as another villain.

Main characters

Leading Man

Main characters

Secondary / recurring characters

Special Participation

References

External links 
 http://news.abs-cbn.com/ ABS-CBN

Blood Sisters